Morris is a city in and the county seat of Grundy County, Illinois, United States and part of the southwest Chicago metropolitan area. The population was estimated at 15,053 in 2019.

Description 

Morris is the Grundy County seat and has a large hospital and modern schools. It is home to the Morris Community High School Redskins, who have won three state championships in football. There are many small parks, ball diamonds, tennis courts, two golf courses, an outdoor swimming pool, an indoor olympic-sized pool as well as the Gebhard Woods State Park and the William G. Stratton State Park for boat launching on the Illinois River and a skatepark located near White Oak elementary school. Morris is home to the Grundy County Speedway, and the city also hosts the annual Grundy County Fair and Grundy County Corn Festival.

Geography

Climate
The annual precipitation for Morris is about 40 inches. The record high for Morris is 109 °F (43 °C) on July 14, 1936. The record low for Morris is -26 °F (−32 °C) in December 1924. The average high temperature for Morris in July is 84.5 °F (43 °C), while the average January low is 15.4 °F (-9.2 °C).

Morris has not been struck by any major tornadoes in recent history, although they occur in Northern Illinois annually. Morris was the first town hit by the Super Outbreak of April 3–4, 1974. However, the damage within the city was relatively minor, and nobody was injured.

The city can receive heavy snowfall and experience blizzards periodically.

Demographics

As of the census of 2000, there were 11,928 people, 4,831 households, and 3,067 families residing in the city. The racial makeup of the city was 86.7% White, 4.3% African American, 0.3% Native American, 1.4% Asian, 0.0% Pacific Islander, 6.7% from other races, and 2.9% from two or more races. Hispanic or Latino of any race were 15.5% of the population.

There were 5,084 households, out of which 31.7% had children under the age of 18 living with them, 50.8% were married couples living together, 9.3% had a female householder with no husband present, and 36.5% were non-families. 31.0% of all households were made up of individuals, and 13.2% had someone living alone who was 65 years of age or older. The average household size was 2.40 and the average family size was 3.03.

In the city, the population was spread out, with 25.0% under the age of 18, 8.7% from 18 to 24, 29.6% from 25 to 44, 20.4% from 45 to 64, and 16.3% who were 65 years of age or older.  The median age was 37 years. For every 100 females, there were 95.4 males.  For every 100 females age 18 and over, there were 93.0 males.

The median income for a household in the city was $62,563 and the median income for a family was $54,987. Males had a median income of $44,071 versus $25,206 for females. The per capita income for the city was $22,256.  About 5.0% of families and 6.6% of the population were below the poverty line, including 7.2% of those under age 18 and 6.7% of those age 65 or over.

Industries
The Allen Paper Car Wheel Works were based on East North Street in Morris, which supplied the Pullman Palace Car Company in Chicago from 1867 to 1890 with composite wheels for their railway carriages. By the 1920s, the paper mill had become one of the largest employers in Morris, producing cardboard boxes of various shapes, sizes, and colors that were shipped throughout the US.

The plant, located just off U.S. Route 6 heading eastbound away from Morris, employs many Morris residents. In addition to the chemical plant, three nuclear power plants are located within a  radius of the center of Morris. All of the stations are owned by Exelon Corp. Among the stations, Dresden Generating Station generates energy for Chicago and surrounding areas.

Telephone switching history
In early 1960, the world's first electronic switching system was installed at the Morris central office. The system was a milestone in telephone switching history, an experiment whose planning started in the early 1950s, and led to the largest sustained research and development program toward a single goal in the Bell System. After conversion of the existing manual telephone system using telephone operators for completing telephone calls, with an automatic electromechanical crossbar switching system starting in ca. 1958, a few hundred subscribers received dial service from June 1960 through January 1962 from the first mostly electronic system, that used cold-cathode electron tubes, instead of mechanical relays and switches. For telephone subscribers, the most notable characteristic of what is usually called the Morris System was the use of electronic tone ringers which used up to eight different tones produced by a tweeter, rather than the traditional bell ringer.

Notable people 

 Jessie Bartlett Davis, (c. 1859–1861–1905), operatic singer and actress
 Jack Boyle, (1889-1971), third baseman for the Philadelphia Phillies
 Ed Brady, (b. 1960), former NFL linebacker
 Kelly Dransfeldt, (b. 1975), former shortstop for the Texas Rangers and Chicago White Sox
 Careen M. Gordon, (b. 1972), Member of the Illinois House of Representatives from the 75th district from 2003-2011
 Philip C. Hayes, (1833–1916), congressman
 Albert Kingsbury, (1863–1943), engineer, inventor and entrepreneur
 Eric J. Magnuson, (b. 1951), lawyer and Chief Justice of the Minnesota Supreme Court
 Billy Petrick, (b. 1984), former pitcher for the Chicago Cubs
 Walter M. Pierce, (1861–1954), congressman from Oregon's 2nd congressional district and 17th governor of Oregon
 Lyman Beecher Ray (1831–1916), lieutenant governor of Illinois 1889–93, politician and Morris shopkeeper
 Scott Spiezio, (b. 1972), former Major League Baseball third baseman
 Ronald Steel, (b. 1931), award-winning writer, historian, and professor
 James R. Washburn (1921–2007), Illinois state representative and mayor of Morris
 Jerry Weller, (b. 1957), former congressman from the 11th District of Illinois

References

External links

Cities in Illinois
County seats in Illinois
Cities in Grundy County, Illinois
Populated places established in 1853
1853 establishments in Illinois